Pseudozizeeria is a genus of butterflies in the family Lycaenidae. This genus is monotypic, consisting of only one species, Pseudozizeeria maha, which is found in the Indomalayan and Palearctic realms.

External links
Funet Taxonomy Distribution Images

Polyommatini
Lycaenidae genera